Megalopyge hina is a moth of the Megalopygidae family. It was described by Paul Dognin in 1911. It is found from Guyana to Ecuador.

References

Moths described in 1911
Megalopygidae